The Balkan Pact, or Balkan Entente, was a treaty signed by Greece, Romania, Turkey and Yugoslavia on 9 February 1934 in Athens, aimed at maintaining the geopolitical status quo in the region after the end of World War I. To present a united front against Bulgarian designs on their territories, the signatories agreed to suspend all disputed territorial claims against one another and their immediate neighbours following the aftermath of the war and a rise in various regional irredentist tensions.

Other nations in the region that had been involved in related diplomacy refused to sign the document, including Italy, Albania, Bulgaria, Hungary and the Soviet Union. The pact became effective on the day that it was signed and was registered in the League of Nations Treaty Series on 1 October 1934.

The Balkan Pact helped to ensure peace between the signatory nations but failed to end regional intrigues. Although the pact was designed against Bulgaria, on 31 July 1938, its members signed the Salonika Agreement with Bulgaria, which repealed the clauses of the Treaty of Neuilly-sur-Seine and Treaty of Lausanne that had mandated demilitarised zones at Bulgaria's borders with Greece and Turkey, which allowed Bulgaria to rearm.

With the 1940 Treaty of Craiova signed by Romania under Nazi Germany's pressure, and after the 1941 Axis invasions of Yugoslavia and Greece, the pact effectively ceased to exist and Turkey remained as its only signatory that had avoided any conflict during WWII, even after joining the Allies in 1945.

See also
 Balkan Pact (1953)
 Latin Axis (World War II)
 Polish–Romanian alliance
 Little Entente
 Croatian–Romanian–Slovak friendship proclamation

References

External links
 Text of the pact
 Romania and the Balkan Pact (1934-1940)
 The Hidden Side of the Balkan Pact
 BALKAN PACT AND TURKEY

History of the Balkans
History of Greece (1924–1941)
History of the Republic of Turkey
20th-century military alliances
Treaties concluded in 1934
Military alliances involving Greece
Military alliances involving Turkey
Military alliances involving Romania
Military alliances involving Yugoslavia
Treaties of the Kingdom of Romania
Treaties of the Second Hellenic Republic
Treaties of the Kingdom of Yugoslavia
Greece–Yugoslavia relations
Interwar-period treaties
Greece–Turkey relations
Modern history of Athens
Greece–Romania relations
Greater Romania
February 1934 events
Organizations established in 1934
Organizations disestablished in 1938
1934 establishments in Europe
1938 disestablishments in Europe
Romania–Yugoslavia relations